The Tátra class consisted of six destroyers built for the Austro-Hungarian Navy shortly before the First World War.

Design and description
By the last years of the first decade of the 20th century, Admiral Graf Rudolf Montecuccoli, head of the Austro-Hungarian Navy, recognized that the latest s were already obsolete in comparison to larger and faster foreign destroyers. His 1910 expansion plan called for six new large destroyers powered by steam turbines and their construction was awarded to a Hungarian shipyard to secure Hungarian parliamentary approval of the expansion program.

The Tátra-class ships displaced more than twice as much as the Huszár class which allowed them to have a much stronger armament and be significantly faster. The ships had a complement of 105 officers and enlisted men.

The Tátras were powered by two AEG-Curtiss steam turbine sets, each driving a single propeller shaft using steam provided by six Yarrow boilers. Four of the boilers were oil-fired while the remaining pair used coal.

The main armament of the Tátra-class destroyers consisted of two 50-caliber Škoda Works  K11 guns, one each fore and aft of the superstructure in single mounts. Their secondary armament consisted of six 45-caliber  K09 TAG ( (anti-torpedo boat guns)). Two of these were placed on anti-aircraft mountings during the war. They were also equipped with four  torpedo tubes in two twin rotating mountings aft of the funnels.

Ships

Service history

Six additional destroyers were authorised on 28 May 1914 to increase the number of modern destroyers in service, but construction was cancelled before they were laid down when World War I began in August.

References

Notes

Bibliography 
 

 
 

 
Destroyers of the Austro-Hungarian Navy
Destroyer classes
World War I destroyers of Austria-Hungary